The 2018–19 South of Scotland Football League was the 73rd season of the South of Scotland Football League, and the 5th season as the sixth tier of the Scottish football pyramid system. The season began on 28 July 2018 and ended on 10 May 2019. Threave Rovers are the reigning champions.

The league increased to a 16 team division as Wigtown & Bladnoch returned to the league after a one season absence.

Stranraer reserves won the league on 10 April 2019. As a reserve team they are ineligible for promotion to the Lowland League.

Teams

The following teams changed division after the 2017–18 season.

To South of Scotland League
Returned from abeyance
 Wigtown and Bladnoch

 Club has an SFA Licence (as of 20 December 2017) and are eligible to participate in the Lowland League promotion play-off should they win the league.

League table

References

5
Sco